AlterNative: An International Journal of Indigenous Peoples (formerly AlterNative: An International Journal of Indigenous Scholarship) is a quarterly peer-reviewed academic journal published by Ngā Pae o te Māramatanga, New Zealand's Indigenous Centre of Research Excellence (University of Auckland). It covers indigenous studies and scholarly research from native indigenous perspectives from around the world. The journal was established in 2005 and the editors-in-chief are listed in 2021 as Dr Tracey McIntosh and Dr Carwyn Jones (Victoria University of Wellington Te Herenga Waka).

Tracey McIntosh (University of Auckland) is also a Director at Ngā Pae o te Māramatangā.

External links 
 
 Ngā Pae o te Māramatanga

References

Anthropology journals
Publications established in 2005
Quarterly journals
Indigenous rights publications
Multilingual journals